Andrew John Rincon (born March 5, 1959) is a former Major League Baseball pitcher born in Monterey Park, California on March 5, 1959.  He was drafted out of St. Paul High School in Santa Fe Springs California by the St. Louis Cardinals in the 5th round of the 1977 Major League Baseball Draft.  He was a "September Call-up" in 1980.  He started four games, going 3–1 with a 2.61 ERA.  This earned him another brief look the next year, when he had a similar 3–1 record, this time with a 1.77 ERA in five starts. That season, he was hit in the arm by a line drive by Phil Garner, thus hampering his career. Rincon Cardinals started six games and relieved in five games, finishing with a 2–3 record and 4.72 ERA.  The next year, Rincon did not make it to the Major Leagues at all, and the Cardinals released him at the end of 1983.  The San Diego Padres signed him that offseason, but he never pitched in the majors again.

External links
, or Baseball Almanac

1959 births
Living people
Major League Baseball pitchers
St. Louis Cardinals players
Calgary Cardinals players
Baseball players from California
Hawaii Islanders players
Gastonia Cardinals players